Victor Julio Alves de Paula (born 26 December 2000), commonly known as Vitinho, is a Brazilian footballer who plays as an attacking midfielder for Avaí, on loan from Hercílio Luz.

Club career
Born in Recife, Pernambuco, Vitinho started his career playing for a social project named Associação Desportiva de Pernambuco (Adesppe) before joining Sport Recife's youth setup at the age of 13. He subsequently represented  before moving to Flamengo-SP in 2018.

Vitinho made his senior debut with Flamengo in the 2019 Campeonato Paulista Segunda Divisão, before returning to the under-20 side in 2020. On 19 January 2021, he joined Vera Cruz.

Vitinho moved to Hercílio Luz on loan for the 2021 Copa Santa Catarina, but remained for the 2022 Campeonato Catarinense, and was bought outright by the club on 11 April 2022. Four days later, he was announced at Série A side Avaí, on loan until December 2024.

Vitinho made his debut in the top tier of Brazilian football on 22 May 2022, coming on as a late substitute for Dentinho in a 1–2 away loss against Athletico Paranaense.

Career statistics

References

External links
Avaí profile 

2000 births
Living people
Brazilian footballers
Sportspeople from Recife
Association football midfielders
Campeonato Brasileiro Série A players
Associação Atlética Flamengo players
Vera Cruz Futebol Clube players
Hercílio Luz Futebol Clube players
Avaí FC players